Arpachayi (also Romanized as Ārpāchāyī; also known as Ārpāchāy) is a village in Ahmadabad Rural District, Takht-e Soleyman District, Takab County, West Azerbaijan Province, Iran. At the 2006 census, its population was 251, in 48 families.

References 

Populated places in Takab County